Alice Madge Dawson (5 March 1908 – 15 June 2003) was an Australian educator, social worker, researcher and pioneering feminist. She created the Women's Studies course in the Department of Adult Education at the University of Sydney.

Biography
Dawson was born Alice Madge Burton, in Echunga in South Australia in 1908. Although she won a scholarship to study medicine at Adelaide University the family couldn't afford to pay for the costs of living there and instead Dawson became a teacher, partly funded by the availability of the South Australian Education Department allowance. Teachers in the area experienced similar discrimination to many women around the world, the men earned a higher salary and married women were not allowed to work. When Dawson went to Sydney University similar discriminations were still in place, women were not offered the home loan scheme for married staff. Dawson took on this latter position and won the case, getting the loan.

In 1934 Dawson married another teacher David Dawson and in 1937 the pair began to travel. They visited Japan, Germany and the USSR as well as China and the UK. The time frame meant they saw events unfolding in Nazi Germany from the ground, including a speech by Goebbels which Dawson remembered as extremely disturbing. Dawson settled in London until after the end of World War II. She worked in an aircraft factory and they adopted a son Sean in 1940 as well as having another son, Paddy, in 1945.

For several years after the war Dawson gained a number of new qualifications before they returned to Australia in 1954. Dawson got involved in several political movements, particularly Aboriginal rights and against the Vietnam war. In 1956 she began working as a lecturer in Sydney University where she began the work that would become Women's studies.

Initially her course talked about the socio-economic and political status of women in Europe. Many of her students became leading academics in the new feminist movements and the course led to the publication of her book Graduate and Married (University of Sydney, 1965). She continued to research the topics and produced two further books with academics from three Sydney universities, retiring in 1973 but continuing to lecture part time. Dawson was awarded an honorary master's from Sydney University as well as an honorary doctorate from Macquarie University in 1989. She died 15 June 2003.

Bibliography
 Graduate and Married, 1965
 Why So Few? Women Academics in Australian Universities, 1983
 Against the Odds: Fifteen Professional Women Reflect on their Lives and Careers, 1984
 Families: Australian studies of changing relationships within the family and between the family and society, 1974

Sources

1908 births
2003 deaths
Australian feminists
Australian women's rights activists